Kárász is a village in Baranya county, Hungary. Its population was 289 people, as of 2021, split into 151 homes. The geographic size as 802 hectares.

History  
The village was established prior to 1325 and is mentioned in reference to the village of Bóda. It is therefore speculated that the village was first created under the Árpád era.
Another nearby community was established in 1778 by German artisans. The village expanded when the Dombóvár-Bátaszék railway line was built in the 1870s.

References

External links 
http://www.karasz.hu/ 

Populated places in Baranya County